Pass the Dust, I Think I'm Bowie is the sole studio album by Black Randy and the Metrosquad, released in 1979 by record label Dangerhouse.

Reception 

Online magazine Tiny Mix Tapes called it "heavily intoxicating, and despite all the nastiness abound, a pretty damn good time."

Track listing
"I Slept in an Arcade" – 2:28
"Marlon Brando" – 1:54
"I Tell Lies Every Day" – 1:54
"Down at the Laundrymat" – 3:27
"I Wanna Be a Nark" – 1:45
"Give It Up or Turn It A-Loose" – 2:15
"Idi Amin" – 1:30
"Sperm Bank Baby" – 1:20
"Barefootin' on the Wicket Picket" – 4:02
"San Francisco" – 1:54
"Tellin' Lies" – 1:54
"(Say It Loud) I'm Black and Proud (Part 1)" – 2:54
"(Theme From) Shaft" – 2:41

References

External links 

 

1979 debut albums
Dangerhouse Records albums
Black Randy and the Metrosquad albums